The 29th Motor Torpedo Boat Flotilla was a motor torpedo boat (MTB) flotilla manned and crewed by Royal Canadian Navy (RCN) reservists in service with the Coastal Forces of the Royal Navy during the Second World War. The 29th MTB Flotilla had a short & distinguished history in the English Channel, including action during the landings at Normandy in 1944.

Operations 
Formed in March 1944 under the command of an experienced Lt Anthony Law (RCNVR) and equipped with eight British built 71 ft 6ins (Mk.VI) Type 'G' MTBs, the 29th Flotilla conducted initial work up training at HMS Bee Coastal Forces Base at (Holyhead) throughout the month of April 1944, moving to its first operational base HMS Fervent Coastal Forces Base (Ramsgate) in May 1944.

The first mission assigned to the 29th MTB Flotilla was given to MTBs 460,462,464 and 465. Tasked with escorting a clandestine mine gathering expedition to the German controlled Normandy coast, on 16 May 1944 the Canadian MTBs proceeded to the French Coast along with two British MTBs, protecting them as volunteers were landed ashore by outboards to lift sample mines from the German beach defence. Managing to accomplish their mission undetected, the captured mines provided much needed intelligence prior to the Allied D-Day landings.

Between 20 and 22 May 1944, the 29th MTB Flotilla joined RCN Tribal-class destroyers and the 65th MTB Flotilla in intercepting enemy coastal convoys in the English Channel. Targeting German schnellboote (E-boats), escort ships, merchant vessels; the MTBs lured German destroyers within the gun range of accompanying heavier warships. Following this success, on 27 May 1944 the 29th MTB Flotilla moved to HMS Hornet Coastal Forces Base at Gosport (Portsmouth), in preparation for Operation Neptune in June 1944.

During the Normandy invasion on June 6, 1944, the 29th Flotilla was tasked with guarding the east flank of the invasion fleets, while the 65th Flotilla was assigned to protect the western flank. Following the invasion, the MTBs of the 29th Flotilla patrolled the 15 km distance between the eastern edge of the assault area and the German naval base at Le Havre. Each night three or four Canadian MTBs waited until larger Allied ships tracked the German surface ships attempting either to attack the allied assault area or transport supplies into Le Havre. Typically, short, sharp engagements followed, with the Germans turning back to safety once they realized Allied forces were in place. The 29th Flotilla carried out this duty through August 1944, and in the words of the flotilla commander Lt Cdr Anthony Law, RCNVR:Based at HMS Beehive, Felixstowe in October 1944, the 29th Flotilla was later transferred to Coastal Forces Mobile Unit (CFMU) No. 1, Ostend, Belgium where disaster struck. The 29th Flotilla was disbanded shortly after five Canadian boats were sunk & twenty-six sailors were killed by an explosion while alongside at Ostend,  on 14 February 1945. After the disbandment of the 29th MTB Flotilla, the remaining Canadian boats were attached to other RN flotillas.

71ft 6ins (Mk.VI) Type 'G' motor torpedo boat 
Built by the British Power Boat Company (BPB) at their yard in Hythe, Hampshire, originally eight 71 ft 6in (known to the Canadians as Type ‘G’ ) MTBs (459, 460, 461, 462, 463, 464, 465, 466) were assigned to the 29th MTB Flotilla, with three more boats (485, 486, 491) added later to replace damaged or sunken vessels.  Originally designed as Motor Gun Boats (MGBs), they were modified and re-designated as MTBs. Different boats received torpedo tubes at different times and several boats (such as MTB 460)were photographed whilst in service without torpedo tubes, although having the mounting rails fitted to their decks. These boats had to fight as MGBs until they received their torpedoes, although still carrying 'MTB' pennant numbers. (Driven by three Packard V-12 Supercharged 1250 H.P. engines, each with a 2,500 gallon capacity of 100 octane gas, these vessels had an operational radius of about 140 miles while cruising at 25 knots, and a top speed of some 40 knots. MTB 486 is the only known MTB of the 29th MTB Flotilla to survive into the 21st century as a civilian houseboat renamed Sungo.

See also 

 Coastal Forces of the Royal Navy
 Coastal Forces of the Royal Canadian Navy

References

Further reading 

 Reynolds, L. C. (2002) Motor Gunboat 658: The Small Boat War in the Mediterranean. 
 Fairmile Bs of the Royal Canadian Navy - Bibliography

External links 

 Canadian Coastal Forces Trust
 Canadian Nautical Research Society

Naval history of Canada
World War II naval ships